Acacia handonis, commonly known as Hando's wattle or Percy Grant wattle, is a shrub belonging to the genus Acacia and the subgenus Phyllodineae that is native to parts of north eastern Australia. In 2008 it was listed as vulnerable according to the Environment Protection and Biodiversity Conservation Act 1999.

Description
It has finely ribbed branchlets with short, scattered, glandular hairs. Like most species of Acacia it has phyllodes rather than true leaves. The evergreen, crowded phyllodes are straight, erect and sometimes subverticillate and usually slightly recurved at the apex. It produces bright yellow flowers between July and September. The simple inflorescences occur singly in the axils and have spherical flower-heads containing 30 bright yellow flowers.

Distribution
The shrub has a limited distribution in south eastern Queensland to the north of Chinchilla in the Barakula area where it is found in undulating country usually stony ridges where it grows in sandy or clay lateritic soils sometimes with ironstone gravel as a part of open Eucalyptus woodland communities. In 1994 the total population was estimated to be 10,080 individual plants where 4,200 are mature and the remainder are juveniles. They were distributed over three separate stands with a large variation in the density of plants. None of the plants are found in conservation areas.

See also
 List of Acacia' species

References

handonis
Flora of Queensland
Plants described in 1981
Taxa named by Leslie Pedley